Yandex Eats ( tr. Yandeks Eda; stylised as Yandex.Eda) is a Russian online food ordering and delivery platform launched by Yandex in 2018. Delivery is carried out by courier services partnered with Yandex and individuals working for the company. Customers can choose from pizzerias, bakeries, restaurants of Georgian and Japanese cuisine, burgers, steak houses, and grocery stores: Magnit, Dixie, VkusVill, Metro, and other establishment.

As of March 2021, Yandex.Eats operates in  Moscow, St. Petersburg, Kazan, Sochi, in a total of 170 cities in Russia 1 city in Kazakhstan and Armenia. Yandex.Eats works with more than 33,000 restaurants, including McDonald's, Papa John's, Yakitoria, Khleb Nasushny, Teremok, Black Star Burger, URYUK, the Rostinter restaurant chain (which includes IL Patio, TGI FRIDAYS, Planet Sushi, Shikari, and Costa Coffee), KetchUp, Burger Heroes.

The service is part of the Yandex online trade, transport, and logistics business group. Among the stores that work with the service are Azbuka Vkusa, Verny, and Magnolia.

In September 2022, Yandex.Eats started operating in Armenia.

How it works 

Food is ordered using the Yandex.Eats application (iOS or Android), or through the website, as well as through the Yandex Go and Yandex.

To order through the site or application, the user selects a restaurant or store from those available at the specified address. You can also filter order delivery from food malls. The user selects dishes or products, adds them to the cart, selects a payment method and places an order for home delivery or pickup.

If a restaurant works with the Yandex.Eats delivery service, the user receives notifications when the restaurant starts preparing an order. When an order is picked up from a restaurant by a courier service cooperating with Yandex.Eats, the user receives notifications about changes in the status of the order, and can also track their order on a map in real time.

Service claims 
On April 19, 2019, information appeared that following a ten-hour shift working for Yandex.Eats, 21-year-old courier Artyk Orozaliev collapsed and died.

After the incident, the company launched an internal review on the side of the partner organization, and also contacted the family of the deceased and offered financial assistance. In addition, the company promised to consider options for technological solutions to organize control over processing in the courier application.

Later, a medical examination found that the tragedy occurred due to heart failure.

On April 24, Yandex.Eats CEO Maxim Firsov said that the company changed the mechanism for choosing breaks for couriers: according to the new scheme, it became enough to press the pause button in the application. Previously, it was necessary to chat with the supervisor and wait for his permission to take a break. According to Maxim Firsov, this was done in order to avoid the influence of the human factor when the courier needs a break.

References 

Yandex
Online food ordering
2017 mergers and acquisitions